Engaño Bay is a bay off the coast of Rawson, Patagonia, Argentina.

The Chubut River drains into the Atlantic Ocean at Engaño Bay . The bay is rather shallow but is known for its high productivity of shrimps and small fish throughout the warmer months.

References

Bays of Argentina
Landforms of Chubut Province